The Miami International Autodrome is a purpose-built temporary circuit around Hard Rock Stadium and its private facilities in the Miami suburb of Miami Gardens, Florida. The track was designed and delivered by Formula One track designers, Apex Circuit Design, for the Miami Grand Prix, which was added to the Formula One calendar for the 2022 World Championship.

History
The track had been proposed as early as October 2019 with an initial design at the venue, with up to 75 circuit designs having been considered, and 36 being simulated. The stadium's owner, Stephen Ross, had been attempting to attract Formula One for several years before the initial design was published. Organizers for the Grand Prix at Hard Rock Stadium had an agreement in principle to host a race from 2021, but this was delayed. Miami Gardens commissioners had initially voted against the track's creation, but this was reversed on April 14, 2021. On September 2, 2021, the track was officially named as the "Miami International Autodrome".

Circuit
The circuit is on the private grounds of Hard Rock Stadium, and uses new and existing roads within. The permanent asphalt pathways of the circuit are integrated into the Hard Rock Stadium parking areas. The circuit is a temporary circuit, and does not use any public streets that are located around Hard Rock Stadium, though it does cross public roads. Each year and a few weeks before the race weekend, the circuit and its safety features are assembled just for the race weekend. After the race weekend, the circuit is dismantled and Hard Rock Stadium grounds are converted back to normal.

Lap records

The fastest official race lap records at the Miami International Autodrome are listed as:

References 

Miami
Miami International Autodrome
Miami International Autodrome
Miami International Autodrome